Thomas C. Salamone (March 28, 1927 – April 15, 2014) was an American politician and businessman.

Born in Waterbury, Connecticut, Salamone served in the United States Navy during World War II and went to Post University. He owned Salamone Insurance Agency. Salamone served in the Connecticut House of Representatives, from Wolcott, Connecticut, as a Democrat, from 1963 until 1971.

Notes

1927 births
2014 deaths
Politicians from Waterbury, Connecticut
People from Wolcott, Connecticut
Businesspeople from Connecticut
Democratic Party members of the Connecticut House of Representatives
20th-century American businesspeople